The chirping cisticola (Cisticola pipiens) is a species of bird in the family Cisticolidae.
It is found in Angola, Botswana, Burundi, Democratic Republic of the Congo, Namibia, Tanzania, Zambia, and Zimbabwe.
Its natural habitats are subtropical or tropical seasonally wet or flooded lowland grassland and swamps.

Gallery

References

External links
 Chirping cisticola - Species text in The Atlas of Southern African Birds.

chirping cisticola
Birds of Central Africa
chirping cisticola
Taxonomy articles created by Polbot